"Volevo te" (i.e. "I used to want you") is a song recorded by Italian singer Giusy Ferreri, for her album Hits (2015). The song was released on November 6, 2015 as the first single from the album.

The song was written by Fortunato Zampaglione, and produced by Fabrizio Ferraguzzo. Ferreri described the song as "The ideal meeting point between Novembre and Roma-Bangkok."

The music video, directed by Mauro Russo, was published on December 4, 2015 on the official YouTube channel of the singer.

Charts

Certifications

References

External links
 

2015 singles
Italian songs
2015 songs
Giusy Ferreri songs
Dancehall songs
Sony Music singles
Songs written by Fortunato Zampaglione